, also known as Furano Ski Area, is a resort in Furano, Hokkaido, Japan, owned and operated by Prince Hotels. The resort became famous for its long-standing relationship with the FIS Alpine Ski World Cup. In more recent years, it has held the mid-February Snowboarding World Cup, sponsored by Dydo Drinco. A view from the top of the slopes offers a panoramic view of the Furano Valley and the Tokachi Peak Mountain Range. Recently, there has been a sudden influx of interest from winter sports enthusiasts abroad, particularly from Australia, and the number of tourists has increased every year.

Ski season
The resorts generally operates from around the end of November to the beginning of May.

Accommodation
Accommodation is in three main areas. At the base of the Furano Zone, at the base of the Kitanomine Zone or in downtown Furano. There is a lot of accommodation around the base of the Kitanomine Zone within a short walk of the lifts. Accommodation includes hotels, pensions, western-style self-contained condominiums and backpackers. In the Furano Zone the only accommodation next to the lifts is the ski-in ski-out New Furano Prince Hotel.

Transport
The public bus service called Lavender runs from New Furano Prince Hotel via the Kitanomine resort area and then into downtown Furano. In addition to this there is a night Resort Shuttle Bus from New Furano Prince Hotel to downtown Furano via Kitanomine.

Airports
Asahikawa Airport
This is the closest Airport to Furano. From Asahikawa Airport you can take a public bus service called Lavender. This is a public bus service and therefore cannot be paid in advance. Alternatively Hokkaido Resort Liner operate a reserved seat service.
New Chitose Airport
 From New Chitose Airport Hokkaido Resort Liner operate a bus service several times a day directly to Furano. This bus must be booked in advance and only operates in winter.

Railways
Those coming from Asahikawa may take the Furano Line directly to Furano Station. Those coming from the New Chitose Airport, Sapporo, and Takikawa areas can go by way of the JR Nemuro Main Line. There is also a low-transit time Direct Limited Express Train that runs seasonally from Sapporo.

Buses
A bus route operated by Furano Bus Systems known as the Lavender Express runs between Asahikawa Station, Asahikawa Airport, and Furano Station. The transit time from Asahikawa Station to the ski area is around one and a half hours. From the airport it takes roughly seventy minutes, and from those coming up from the town below, it is ten minutes from the train station. There are also direct routes running from various hotels inside the cities of Asahikawa and Sapporo, however these only run during the winter months. A bus from Shimukappu also runs, however it avoids the ski resort area altogether, only going as far as Furano Station.

Automobiles
National Highway 237, running very near the Asahikawa Airport, connects Asahikawa and Furano, reducing travel times and commuting stress. From New Chitose Airport and the Greater Sapporo Area, Hokkaido Prefectural Roads serve the needs of the busy traveller.

Ski slopes

Furano Ski Resort is divided into two areas, the Furano Zone and the Kitanomine Zone. The 24 courses are serviced by a series of lifts and gondolas.

Lift statistics

References

External links

 Furano Reviews
 Hokkaido Ski Resort 

Ski areas and resorts in Hokkaido
Prince Hotels
Tourist attractions in Hokkaido